Contract lifecycle management (CLM) is the proactive, methodical management of a contract from initiation through award, compliance and renewal. Implementing CLM can lead to significant improvements in cost savings and efficiency. Understanding and automating CLM can also limit organizational liability and increase compliance with legal requirements.

Contract Lifecycle Management Stages 
There are many different phases of each contract – no matter the size or importance of any particular document, they must all go through each stage in order to be completed properly.

The stages of the contract lifecycle management process include:
Requests - The start of every contract involves the actual request. This is the phase where involved parties gather all the relevant information and data they need in order to create a contract that works for both sides. The request stage is arguably one of the most important stages of the contract lifecycle and can take some time depending on who is involved.  
Authoring - This is the stage where the contract actually gets written. Both parties put their terms into writing and ‘solidify’ their clauses and relevant information relating to their contractual obligations.
Negotiations - The negotiation stages are where both parties continue to negotiate specific contract parameters – this is the stage that directly precedes final approval. Negotiations can be very quick or prolonged – it entirely depends on the method of negotiation, the involved parties, the scale of the contract, how many people are involved, etc. Use of contract lifecycle management software can drastically reduce the amount of time spent in the negotiation phase.
Approval - Once both sides have agreed on the various terms, clauses and dates relating to the particular contract, it can now be approved. Department heads, executives, and ‘higher-ups’ may need to get involved at this phase of the contract to ensure everything is as it needs to be. Once the contract gets the approval from the relevant departments and/or personnel, the contract can then be signed.
Signature - In the signature phase, the contract is signed by whoever needs to sign it in order to become official (who signs the contract is unique to each business). If contract lifecycle management software is used, the signature stage can be done electronically via the internet which drastically reduces the amount of time this stage takes.
Obligation - Each involved party and personnel will have their own set of responsibilities and obligations pertaining to the specific contract.
Compliance - Compliance means the involved parties and personnel all keep to their various obligations. Without a proper system or contract lifecycle management software, compliance can be difficult to keep track of and can result in legal ramifications, late fees, bottlenecks, and other business hazards.
Renewal - After a document is expired (or when it is nearing expiration) a contract must be renewed and renegotiated. Contract lifecycle management software makes it easy for businesses to keep track of expiry dates and upcoming renewals.

References 

Contract law